The chestnut-crowned gnateater (Conopophaga castaneiceps) is a species of bird in the family Conopophagidae. It is found in Colombia, Ecuador, and Peru.

Taxonomy and systematics

The position of the chestnut-crowned gnateater in linear format is unsettled. The International Ornithological Committee (IOC) and the Clements taxonomy place it differently within the gnateater family.

Four subspecies are recognized, though birds on the western slope of Colombia's Central Andes might be an unnamed taxon: 

C. c. chocoensis Chapman (1915)
C. c. castaneiceps Sclater (1857) 
C. c. chapmani Carriker (1933)
C. c. brunneinucha von Berlepsch & Stolzmann (1896)

Description

The male of the nominate subspecies has brown upper parts; a gray face, throat, and chest; and orange-brown flanks and vent area. The top of the head is orange-red and there is a white tuft behind the eye. C. c. chapmani has a brighter (less brown) crown. C. c. brunneinucha'''s orange-red is only the forehead; it is darker overall and has a white patch on the belly. C. c. chocoensis is similar to brunneinucha but is smaller, has less gray, has a more olive tinge to the back, and more orange-red on the crown. The female's head and chest are orange-red and the belly is whitish. The white plume behind the eye is smaller than that of the male.

Distribution and habitat

The chestnut-crowned gnateater occurs in discontinuous areas from central Colombia to south-central Peru. C. c. chocoensis is found in Colombia on the western slope of the Western Andes and in the Serranía del Baudó of western Chocó Department. C. c. castaneiceps is found in Colombia's Central and Eastern Andes and into Ecuador. C. c. chapmani is found on the east slope of the Andes from southern Ecuador to the Department of San Martín in northern Peru. C. c. brunneinucha'' is found on the east slope of the Peruvian Andes from Huánuco south to Cuzco. It inhabits subtropical and tropical rainforest. Though it lives in the forest interior, it prefers smaller vegetation there in openings such as regrowing landslides.

Behavior

Feeding

The chestnut-crowned gnateater forages for arthropods in leaf litter and foliage on and near the ground.

Breeding

Little is known about the chestnut-crowned gnateater's breeding phenology. Birds were noted in breeding condition between March and June in Colombia's Central Andes.

Vocalization

The chesnut-crowned gnateater's song is "a series of frog-like, slightly disyllabic notes" that accelerate and get louder after the first one or two notes . Its calls include a "harsh 'zhiek!'”  and a "lower 'schek'” .

Status

The IUCN has assessed the chestnut-crowned gnateater as being of Least Concern. It is not common in parts of its range but does occur in at least one protected area. It might benefit from the dense vegetation that grows in human-disturbed areas.

References

chestnut-crowned gnateater
Birds of the Colombian Andes
Birds of the Northern Andes
chestnut-crowned gnateater
chestnut-crowned gnateater
Taxonomy articles created by Polbot